Moonwind is a 1986 science fiction novel by English author Louise Lawrence about two teenagers winning a trip to the Moon. One of them, Gareth, a rebellious Welsh child, falls in love with an alien, Bethkahn, after the two meet on a couple of brief encounters. In the final pages of the book Gareth walks out onto the Moon to his death, just before shouting "I am here, Bethkahn".

References
 

1986 British novels
English science fiction novels
Novels set on the Moon
1986 in England
Harper & Row books